Based in the iconic Spectrum building in the city of Bristol, a dedicated team deliver the highly regarded Planning Portal application service and guidance, supported by colleagues at Planning Portal's parent company, TerraQuest.

Since 2002, the Planning Portal has helped to transform the planning process, making information and services simpler and more accessible for those involved in the process, be that applicants, agents or local authorities.

The company’s ongoing mission is to continue and build on this; transforming planning and building for England and Wales.

By working in partnership with every local authority across England and Wales and focusing on delivering a quality service to their customers, Planning Portal continues to be the national home of planning and building regulations information and the national planning application service.

As a joint venture between the Department for Levelling Up, Housing and Communities and TerraQuest Solutions Ltd, Planning Portal’s vision is to be a successful, energetic and ethical company that values its employees, respects its customers and provides a first-class service to the development industry.

The company will carry on building on successes and continue to develop a world-leading online application service.

Timeline of the Planning Portal service.

References

External links

Interactive Guidance

Government services web portals in the United Kingdom
Internet properties established in 2002
Town and country planning in the United Kingdom